The Rhein-Zeitung (RZ) is a regional German daily broadsheet newspaper published in Koblenz by Mittelrhein-Verlag GmbH and distributed across Rhineland-Palatinate.

Notable people

Editors

References 

German-language newspapers
Daily newspapers published in Germany
German news websites
Newspapers published in Germany